The women's 5000 metres event at the 2009 Summer Universiade was held on 9–11 July.

Results

References

Results (archived)

5000
2009 in women's athletics
2009